Talking Heads is an Australian television series presented by Peter Thompson. It premiered on ABC1 in 2005 and aired for six series until its cancellation in 2010. The first three series were filmed at Brisbane Powerhouse in New Farm, Queensland; the series relocated to Adelaide in 2008.

References

External links

Australian Broadcasting Corporation original programming
2005 Australian television series debuts
2010 Australian television series endings
Australian non-fiction television series
English-language television shows